Sirjan University of Technology, is a public, coeducational research university located in Sirjan, Iran.

First building of this university founded in 1992 and it began its activities with Mechanical engineering department under the license of Shahid Bahonar University of Kerman.

With its expansion, the university now boasts five science and engineering departments and it now separated from Shahid Bahonar University of Kerman and There are currently around 4,500 students enrolled in undergraduate and graduate programs.
Electrical engineering and Robotic engineering departments have been established in winter of 2012.

Faculties 

 Engineering
 Department of Mechanical Engineering
 Department of Civil Engineering
 Department of Software Engineering
 Department of Electrical Engineering
 Department of Chemical Engineering
 Department of Robotic Engineering
 Science
 Department of Mathematics
 Department of Physics
 Department of Computer Sciences
 Department of Engineering sciences

Endowment 
Sirjan University of technology is a public university and its funding is provided by the government of Iran. For the top ranks of the national university entrance exam, education is free in all public universities. Those ranking lower are required to pay part or all of the tuition.

External links 
Official website of Sirjan University Of Technology

Educational institutions established in 1992
Education in Kerman Province
Universities in Iran
Buildings and structures in Kerman Province
1992 establishments in Iran